The Executive Power of the Baku City, informally called the  mayoralty of Baku, is the executive authority of Azerbaijan's capital, Baku. Its seat is in the Baroque building, built in the beginning of the 20th century.

During Soviet era the Executive Power of the Baku City was named the Executive Committee of the Baku City Workers' Deputies Council (in 1939–1977), then the Executive Committee of the Baku City National Deputies' Council (in 1977–1991). Since 1991 it has been named the executive power of the Baku City.

Building

The building of Baku City Executive Power was originally built as three-floor Baku City Duma and was influenced by layout of Hôtel de Ville. It has a spacious vestibule, wide corridors, marble principal staircase and sophisticated interiors. The second floor houses the state rooms and session hall.

The red decorative bricks and colored marble for the construction were brought from Italy.  Having posted a tower in the center of main front and uniting it organically with main part, Józef Gosławski provided brightness and entireness of the composition amid complex details and elements. The central part of the facade bears the seal of Baku, which incorporates three golden torches. The building was Gosławski's last work, he died in the year the building was finished.

References

External links
Google Maps profile

Buildings and structures in Baku
Buildings and structures completed in 1904
Baroque architecture in Azerbaijan
1904 establishments in Azerbaijan